Bill Barrett (1929–2016) was an American politician.

Bill Barrett may also refer to:

Bill Barrett (utility player), professional baseball player, 1871–1873
Bill Barrett (outfielder) (1900–1951), Major League Baseball player
Bill Barrett (swimmer) (born 1960), American swimmer
Bill Barrett Corporation, US oil and gas exploration and development company
Bill Barrett (artist) (born 1934), American artist
Bill Barrett (Māori leader) (1878–1953), New Zealand Māori tribal leader

See also
William Barrett (disambiguation)

Barrett, Bill